Retropolitan is a collaborative studio album by rapper Skyzoo and producer Pete Rock. The album was released on September 20, 2019 on Mello Music Group. The album was entirely produced by Pete Rock. The album features guest appearances, including Westside Gunn, Conway the Machine, Benny the Butcher, Styles P, Elzhi, Raheem DeVaughn and Pete Rock. The song "It's All Good" become the first single off the album and it features a music video released by Mello Music Group.

Critical reception
The album has received positive attention from music critics. One publisher from Exclaim! gave this album 8 out of 10, saying "Together, these elements elevate Retropolitan past what could've been a nostalgia trip in lesser hands. That shouldn't come as a surprise, however, when the beats come from a studio legend that has remained at the top of his game, and the lyrics come from an aficionado of the old school with one of the moment's freshest flows." Riley Wallace of HipHopDX gave this album 4.4 out of 5, calling it "a sunny walk down memory lane." It also adds "it feels like a modern take. It gives a retrospective context (and sonic second life) to the culture of old New York in an accessible way that doesn’t make anyone feel left out."

Track listing

Charts

Credits 
From the CD :

 David Kutch – Mastering
 Pete Rock – Producer
 Jamie Staub – mixing
 Lorenzo "Captive" Rosado, Renegade El Rey and Almightyrioo – Recording
 Kick James, Sen Floyd – Photography 
 Emmanuel Everett – Illustration
 Jean Goode – Graphic Design, Layout
 Michael Tolle, Skyler Taylor – Executive producer

References

External links 
  Retropolitan at Discogs

2019 albums
Pete Rock albums
Skyzoo albums
Albums produced by Pete Rock
Mello Music Group albums